The 2009–10 USC Trojans women's basketball team represent the University of Southern California in the 2009–10 NCAA Division I women's basketball season. The Trojans are coached by Michael Cooper. The Trojans are a member of the Pacific-10 Conference and will attempt to win the NCAA championship.

Offseason
April 8: Head coach Mark Trakh resigned after guiding the Women of Troy for 5 seasons. Trakh had a 90–64 (.584) record. The Women of Troy won 20 games in 2005 and then 19 in 2006 as both advanced to the second round of the NCAA tourney. Four of his teams made it to the semifinals of the Pac-10 Tournament and had an 8–3 mark against crosstown rival UCLA. His players made various All-Pac-10 teams 20 times and Pac-10 All-Academics squads 14 times. He signed Top 10 recruiting classes the past 4 seasons, including the nation's No. 1 group in 2006, and 7 of his signees were named McDonald's All-Americans. This past season, the Women of Troy went 17–15 overall, tied for fourth in the Pac-10 with a 9–9 mark and made it to the Pac-10 Tournament final for the first time in history before losing to eventual NCAA Final Four participant Stanford.
April 9: USC senior point guard Camille LeNoir was selected in the second-round of the 2009 WNBA Draft. She was chosen by the Washington Mystics as the 23rd pick overall. LeNoir becomes the eighth Trojan to be selected in the WNBA Draf.
 May 1: Los Angeles Sparks head coach and former Los Angeles Lakers great Michael Cooper has been named head coach of the USC women's basketball team, effective at the completion of the Sparks' 2009 season. Joining Cooper's USC staff will be long-time collegiate and high school assistant Ervin Monier, who will oversee the program as associate head coach until Cooper's arrival.
May 4: The Women of Troy will participate in the 2009 US Virgin Islands Paradise Jam at the University of Virgin Islands. The event is celebrating its tenth anniversary. Games will be played at UVI's Sports and Fitness Center, the Caribbean's premier basketball facility located in Charlotte Amalie, St. Thomas.
June 9:USC guard Jacki Gemelos has had her playing career delayed to a knee injury. Already the victim of three ligament tears that have kept her out of action for her first three seasons at USC, Gemelos has suffered another setback when she recently had surgery to replace the ACL graft in her left knee. Gemelos is expected to be sidelined from competition until January 2010.

Season summary
 January 21, 2010 – Pacific-10 Conference issued a public reprimand to Michael Cooper for his post-game comments following USC's game with UCLA on Sunday, January 17.

Roster

Games

|-
!colspan=8| Non-Conference Regular Season Schedule

|-
!colspan=8| Pacific-10 Conference Regular Season Schedule

Player stats

Postseason

Pac-10 Basketball tournament
 See 2010 Pacific-10 Conference women's basketball tournament

NCAA Basketball tournament

Awards and honors

Team players drafted into the WNBA

See also
2009-10 USC Trojans men's basketball team

References

External links
Official Site

USC Trojans women's basketball seasons
Usc
USC Trojans
USC Trojans